National Tidy Town Awards may refer to:

 Australian Tidy Town Awards
 Tidy Towns (Ireland)
 TIDY Northern Ireland
 Keep Wales Tidy

See also 
 Beatification
 Sanitation
 Social engagement